François Marits (25 November 1884 – 2 April 1945) was a Dutch sports shooter. He competed in the 25 m rapid fire pistol event at the 1924 Summer Olympics. He died towards the end of World War II in the Gestapo HQ in Hannover.

References

External links
 

1884 births
1945 deaths
Dutch male sport shooters
Olympic shooters of the Netherlands
Shooters at the 1924 Summer Olympics
People from Kapelle
Dutch people who died in Nazi concentration camps
Dutch civilians killed in World War II
Dutch prisoners of war in World War II
World War II prisoners of war held by Germany
Sportspeople from Zeeland
20th-century Dutch people